SPECfp is a computer benchmark designed to test the floating-point performance of a computer.  It is managed by the Standard Performance Evaluation Corporation.  SPECfp is the floating-point performance testing component of the SPEC CPU testing suit. The first standard SPECfp was released in 1989 as SPECfp89. Later it was replaced by SPECfp92, then SPECfp95, then SPECfp2000, then SPECfp2006, and finally SPECfp2017.

Background
SPEC CPU2017 is a suite of benchmark applications designed to test the CPU performance. The suite is composed of two sets of tests. The first being CINT (aka SPECint) which is for evaluating the CPU performance in integer operations. The second set is CFP (aka SPECfp) which is for evaluating the CPU floating-point operations performance.

The benchmark applications are programs that perform a strict set of operation that simulate real time situations, such as physical simulations, 3D graphics, and image processing. These applications are written in different programming languages, C, C++ and Fortran. Many SPECfp benchmark applications are derived from applications that are freely available to the public and each application is assigned a weight based on its importance.

To compute the SPECfp score, benchmark applications run on a reference machine and the time each application requires for completion is recorded as the reference time. When evaluating the performance of another machine, the benchmark application is run on that system and the time the application requires for completion is recorded. Then the ratio between the recorded time and the reference time is computed. The geometric mean of all the benchmark suite application ratios is then computed as the SPECfp score.

For example, 126.gcc application takes 1280 seconds to complete on the AlphaStation 200 4/100, while it takes 1700 seconds on the reference machine. So, the ratio is: 1700/1280 = 1.328, which implies that AlphaStation 200 4/100 is 32.8% faster than the reference machine in running the 126.gcc.

SPECfp2017 
The SPECfp2017 test is organized in 2 suites: SPECrate 2017 Floating Point and SPECspeed 2017 Floating Point containing in total 23 benchmark programs, designed to evaluate the floating-point operations performance of a given system. The suite was released on June 2, 2017 replacing SPECfp2006 as of January 2018.

SPECfp2006 
The SPECfp2006 test suite contains 17 benchmark programs, designed to evaluate the floating-point operations performance of a given system. Three of these programs are written in C, four are written in C++, six are written in Fortran, and four are written in both C and Fortran. The suite was released on August 24, 2006 replacing SPECfp2000 as of February 2007.

Benchmarks 
The benchmark programs are:

SPECfp2000 
The SPECfp2000 test suite contains 14 benchmark programs, designed to evaluate the floating-point operations performance of a given system. Four of these programs are written in C, six are written in Fortran 77, and four are written in Fortran 90. The suite was released on December 30, 1999 replacing SEPCfp95 as of July 2000. This suite is currently retired.

Benchmarks 
The benchmark programs are:

SPECfp95 
The SPECfp95 test suite contains 10 benchmark programs, designed to evaluate the floating-point operations performance of a given system. The suite was released in March 1995 replacing SEPCfp92 as of September 1995. This suite is currently retired.

Benchmarks
The benchmark programs are:

SPECfp92 
The SPECfp92 test suite contains 14 benchmark programs, designed to evaluate the floating-point operations performance of a given system. Twelve of these programs are written in Fortran, and two are written in C. The suite was released in 1995 replacing SPECfp89. With the release of this suite, the Baseline rule was introduced; in which vendors are no longer allowed to optimize the compilation of the code without reporting it. This suite is currently retired.

Benchmarks 
The benchmark programs are:

See also 
 NBench

References

External links 
  (Floating Point Component of SPEC CPU2006)
  (Floating Point Component of SPEC CPU2000)
  (Floating Point Component of SPEC CPU95)
  (Floating Point Component of SPEC CPU92)

Benchmarks (computing)